St Mary's Church is in Church End in the village of Hale, Halton, Cheshire, England.  The church is recorded in the National Heritage List for England as a designated Grade II listed building.  It is an active Anglican church in the deanery of Widnes, the archdeaconry of Warrington and the diocese of Liverpool.

History

The tower dates from the 14th century and the rest of the church from 1758 to 1759, replacing an earlier church on the site.  Restorations were carried out in 1874, when a northwest vestry was added, and 1903.  In October 1977, the church was the victim of an arson attack, leaving only the walls and the tower still standing.  As a result of the fire there is nothing remaining of the restorations other than the vestry walls.  Following the fire, the foundations of a narrower, timber-framed church were discovered.  The roof and interior of the church were replaced by the architects Buxeby and Evans in 1979–80.

Architecture

Exterior

St Mary's is built in red sandstone ashlar with a slate roof.  Its plan is a rectangle in five bays with a west tower, a northwest vestry, a northeast gabled projecting chapel, and a south porch.  The tower is square with corner buttresses and a crenellated parapet.  It has a west door with a window above it.  At the bell stage are two-light louvred belfry windows on all sides.  The windows on each side of the body of the church are round-headed.  The east window is Venetian in style, glazed in large squares, with a cherub carved in the keystone.

Interior

The roof, dating from 1979 to 1980, is in varnished chestnut.  It is panelled in five compartments, and heavily moulded.  The west organ gallery, standing on Tuscan columns, is a replica of that destroyed in the fire.  The furniture has been acquired from a variety of sources. The font, which consists of a bowl carved with cherubs, dates from the 18th century and spent a century in a garden.  The oak pulpit dating from the 17th century stands on Tuscan columns; it came from York Minster.  The pews came from the demolished church of St Mary, Ince-in-Makerfield.

External features

Also in the churchyard are the war graves of four soldiers of World War I and two of World War II.

See also

Listed buildings in Hale, Halton

References

14th-century church buildings in England
Churches completed in 1759
Church of England church buildings in Cheshire
Grade II listed churches in Cheshire
English Gothic architecture in Cheshire
Neoclassical architecture in Cheshire
Anglican Diocese of Liverpool
Religious buildings and structures in the United Kingdom destroyed by arson
Neoclassical church buildings in England